Həsənli (also, Hasanli) is a village and municipality in the Barda Rayon of Azerbaijan.  It has a population of 273.

References 

Populated places in Barda District